Ernst Schelle (1864–1945) was a German botanist who specialized in cacti. He was employed as Inspector of the botanical gardens in Tübingen. The grass species Helictotrichon schellianum  (Hack.) Kitag. is named for him.

Publications
 Handbuch der Laubholz-Benenung, 1903 (with Ludwig Beissner, Hermann Zabel) – Handbook of deciduous tree designation.
 Handbuch der kakteenkultur: Kurze beschreibung der meisten gegenwärtig im handel befindlichen kakteen, nebst angabe zu deren pflege. Für gärtner und kakteenliebhaber zusammengestellt, 1907 – Handbook of cacti culture, etc. 
 Die winterharten Nadelhölzer Mitteleuropas, 1909  – Hardy conifers of mid-Europe.
 Der Blumengarten. Anleitung zur Anlage, Bepflanzung und Pflege eines einfachen Ziergartens, 1912 – The flower garden. Instructions for installation, planting and maintenance of a simple decorative garden.
 Wörterbuch der botanischen Kunstsprache für Gärtner, Gartenfreunde und Gartenbauzöglinge, 1912 (with Karl Salomon) – Dictionary of botanical technical language for gardeners, garden lovers and horticulture students.
 Botanisches und gärtnerisches Wörterbuch, 1921 (with Karl Salomon) – Botanical and gardening dictionary.
 Kakteen: Kurze Beschreibung nebst Angaben über die Kultur der gegenwärtig im Handel befindlichen Arten und Formen, 1926 – Cacti. Brief description along with information on the culture of types and forms, etc.

Notes

19th-century German botanists
German horticulturists
German gardeners
1864 births
1945 deaths
20th-century German botanists